"God Bless our Sunny Clime" is the national song of The Commonwealth of the Bahamas. Its music was composed by Timothy Gibson (composer and teacher) and E. Clement Bethel (composer, and Director of Culture  of the Bahamas). The lyrics were written by the Rev. Philip Rahming, a Baptist minister and lecturer at the College of the Bahamas.

It should not be confused with the country's national anthem, "March On, Bahamaland", nor with the royal anthem, "God Save the Queen".

Lyrics
God bless our sunny clime, spur us to height sublime.
To keep men free, let brothers, sisters stand
Firm, trusting hand in hand, throughout Bahamaland,
One brotherhood, one brotherhood.

Let gratefulness ascend, courageous deeds extend
From isle to isle. Long let us treasure peace,
So may our lives increase, our prayers never cease.
Let freedom ring! Let freedom ring!

The long, long night has passed, the morning breaks at last,
From shore to shore, sunrise with golden gleam
Sons n' daughters, share the dream, for one working team
One brotherhood, one brotherhood.

Not for this time nor for this chosen few alone
We pledge ourselves. Live loyal to our God.
Love country, friend and foe, oh help us by thy might!
Great God our King! Great God our King!

References

Bahamian songs